Kashmore is a city in Sindh, Pakistan.

Kashmore may also refer to:
Kashmore District, an administrative unit of Sindh, Pakistan
Kashmore Taluka, a tehsil of Kashmore District

See also

Kashmora (1986 film), an Indian film
Kaashmora, an Indian film
Kashmir (disambiguation)
Kashmar, in Iran